Claude Bourrigault (28 January 1932 – 24 August 2021) was a French footballer who played midfielder. He was the brother-in-law of Raymond Kopa.

Biography
Born in Mazé, Bourrigault spent most of his career with Angers SCO. He joined the club in 1954, when it was part of Division 2. He played a role in Angers' rise to Division 1 in 1956 and played in the final of the 1957 Coupe de France, a loss to Toulouse FC. He scored the final goal of the game, but it was not enough to counter six goals from Toulouse.

For the 1963–64 season, Bourrigault played for Stade Rennais, although for only twelve games. He then returned to Angers, where he played one final season before retiring.

Claude Bourrigault died in Avrillé on 24 August 2021 at the age of 89.

References

1932 births
2021 deaths
Sportspeople from Maine-et-Loire
French footballers
Association football midfielders
Ligue 1 players
Ligue 2 players
Angers SCO players
Stade Rennais F.C. players
Footballers from Pays de la Loire